James Odwori (born 23 October 1951) is a Ugandan boxer. He competed in the men's light flyweight event at the 1972 Summer Olympics.

References

1951 births
Living people
Light-flyweight boxers
Ugandan male boxers
Olympic boxers of Uganda
Boxers at the 1972 Summer Olympics
Boxers at the 1970 British Commonwealth Games
Boxers at the 1974 British Commonwealth Games
Commonwealth Games gold medallists for Uganda
Commonwealth Games silver medallists for Uganda
Commonwealth Games medallists in boxing
African Games gold medalists for Uganda
African Games medalists in boxing
Place of birth missing (living people)
Boxers at the 1973 All-Africa Games
Medallists at the 1970 British Commonwealth Games
Medallists at the 1974 British Commonwealth Games